Keith Guthrie may refer to:

 W. K. C. Guthrie (1906–1981), Scottish classical scholar
 Keith Guthrie (diplomat) (1936–2010), American diplomat
 Keith Guthrie (American football) (born 1961), American football defensive tackle